Douglas Lynch (born April 4, 1983) is a Canadian former professional ice hockey defenceman who played with the Edmonton Oilers in the National Hockey League (NHL).

Playing career
Lynch was selected by the Edmonton Oilers in the second round, 43rd overall in the 2001 NHL Entry Draft.  Lynch spent parts of five seasons in the Western Hockey League, the majority of them coming with the Red Deer Rebels, who (although taking him as a forward from Bantam) utilized him as a physical defenceman. After a breakout second full season, he was drafted by the Oilers, who had obtained the pick from the Boston Bruins as part of the Bill Guerin trade.  Lynch finished his junior career with the Spokane Chiefs before graduating to professional hockey.

During his tenure with the Oilers organization, Lynch spent the majority of his time with the Toronto and Edmonton Roadrunners of the American Hockey League, although he did see a brief NHL stint during the 2003–2004 season.  He was named to the 2003–04 AHL All-Rookie team, and played in the All-star game.

On August 3, 2005, he was traded to the St. Louis Blues with Eric Brewer and Jeff Woywitka in exchange for Chris Pronger.  He never played a game for the Blues, instead having spells with the AHL's Peoria Rivermen and the ECHL's Alaska Aces.  In 2007, Lynch signed with Austrian side Red Bull Salzburg.

On April 13, 2012, after three seasons with Salzburg, Lynch left to sign a one-year contract with the Frölunda Indians in Sweden. However, during the 2012-13 season, with a lack of offensive production Lynch left Frölunda mid-season and returned to Salzburg for the remainder of the campaign on January 6, 2013.

Career statistics

Awards and honours

References

External links

www.douglynchhockey.com

1983 births
Alaska Aces (ECHL) players
Canadian ice hockey defencemen
Edmonton Road Runners players
EC Red Bull Salzburg players
Edmonton Oilers draft picks
Edmonton Oilers players
Frölunda HC players
Ice hockey people from British Columbia
Living people
Peoria Rivermen (AHL) players
People from Coquitlam
Red Deer Rebels players
Spokane Chiefs players
Toronto Roadrunners players
Vienna Capitals players
Canadian expatriate ice hockey players in Austria
Canadian expatriate ice hockey players in Sweden